Sara B. Aleshire (22 May 1947 – 2 May 1997) was an American epigrapher and historian of ancient Greek religion, best known for her work on the Asclepieion of Athens, Athenian religious inscriptions, and Athenian prosopography.

Life

Aleshire was born Sara Ellen Bavousett in Lubbock, Texas, where she achieved a BA in Classics at Texas Tech University in 1970, co-authoring her first book during her undergraduate studies. She continued her studies at the University of California, Berkeley with an MA in Linguistics in 1974 and a PhD in Ancient History and Mediterranean Archaeology in 1986. She was a teaching assistant at Berkeley from 1971 to 1973 and a research assistant there in classics and linguistics from 1974 to 1978. After her graduation, she was a permanent research fellow of Berkeley and also a frequent Senior Associate Member of the American School of Classical Studies at Athens. In 1976, Aleshire played a leading role in reviving the Supplementum Epigraphicum Graecum, which had ceased publishing with volume 25 in 1971. She served as the journal's assistant editor and was responsible for the sections dealing with inscriptions of Attica and the Peloponnese until her death in 1997. She was a Fellow in the School of Historical Studies at the Institute for Advanced Studies in Princeton from 1992 to 1993, and Watkins Fellow at the Center for Epigraphical and Palaeographical Studies at Ohio State University in 1996. Aleshire was also editor of Gieben's monograph series ΑΡΧΑΙΑ ΕΛΛΑΣ: Monographs on Ancient Greek History and Archaeology.

She published her PhD thesis as The Athenian Asklepieion: The People, Their Dedications, and the Inventories in 1989, with a companion work, Asklepios at Athens: Epigraphic and Prosopographic Essays on the Athenian Healing Cults in 1991. These works:

Her work on the role of "archaism" in Athenian religion in the time of Augustus, largely published posthumously, has formed the basis for understandings of the role of tradition and the past in Athenian culture in the Roman period. 

Aleshire died suddenly of a heart attack in Athens in 1997. Volume 44 of the Supplementum Epigraphicum Graecum was dedicated to her memory. Aleshire left her collection of epigraphic squeezes, her personal library, and an endowment to Berkeley, where they formed the basis of the "Sara B. Aleshire Center for the Study of Greek Epigraphy," established in 1999.

Bibliography

Notes

References

External links

1947 births
1997 deaths
People from Lubbock, Texas
Scholars of ancient Greek history
Scholars of Greek mythology and religion
Hellenic epigraphers
American classical scholars
Classical scholars of the University of California, Berkeley
Women classical scholars